Tectonophysics, a branch of geophysics, is the study of the physical processes that underlie tectonic deformation. The field encompasses the spatial patterns of stress, strain, and differing rheologies in the lithosphere and asthenosphere of the Earth; and the relationships between these patterns and the observed patterns of deformation due to plate tectonics.

Overview

Tectonophysics is concerned with movements in the Earth's crust and deformations over scales from meters to thousands of kilometers. Examples of such processes include mountain building, the formation of sedimentary basins, postglacial rebound of regions such as Fennoscandia, plate tectonics, volcanoes and earthquakes. This involves the measurement of a hierarchy of strains in rocks and plates as well as deformation rates; the study of laboratory analogues of natural systems; and the construction of models for the history of deformation.

History

Tectonophysics was adopted as the name of a new section of AGU on April 19, 1940 at AGU's 21st Annual Meeting. According to the AGU website (https://tectonophysics.agu.org/agu-100/section-history/), using the words from Norman Bowen, the main goal of the tectonophysics section was to “designate this new borderline field between geophysics, physics and geology … for the solution of problems of tectonics.” Consequently the claim below that the term was defined in 1954 by Gzolvskii is clearly incorrect. Since 1940 members of AGU had been presenting papers at AGU meetings, the contents of which defined the meaning of the field.

Tectonophysics was defined as a field in 1954 when Mikhail Vladimirovich Gzovskii published three papers in the journal Izvestiya Akad. Nauk SSSR, Sireya Geofizicheskaya: "On the tasks and content of tectonophysics", "Tectonic stress fields", and "Modeling of tectonic stress fields". He defined the main goals of tectonophysical research to be study of the mechanisms of folding and faulting as well as large structural units of the Earth's crust. He later created the Laboratory of Tectonophysics at the Institute of Physics of the Earth, Academy of Sciences of the USSR, Moscow.

See also

 Geodynamics
 Palaeogeography
 Rock mechanics
 Seafloor spreading
 Structural geology
 Tectonophysics (journal)

Notes

References

External links 
 American Geophysical Union Tectonophysics Section

Geophysics
Tectonics